The Santa Ana Volcano or Ilamatepec  is a large stratovolcano located in the Santa Ana department of El Salvador. It is located immediately west of Coatepeque Caldera.

The volcano was the inspiration for one of the active volcanoes in Antoine de Saint-Exupéry's famous French novella (The Little Prince), based on his life with his Salvadoran wife  Consuelo de Saint Exupéry, who was The Rose in the story.

Geography
 
The summit of Santa Ana features four nested calderas and volcanic craters, with the innermost containing a small crater lake.  Collapse of the summit during the late Pleistocene (inferring from underlying soil samples, the upper age limit is no more than 57,000 years ago) produced a massive debris avalanche that reached the Pacific Ocean, forming the Acajutla Peninsula.  Subsequent eruptions have largely rebuilt the edifice.

There have been numerous historical eruptions since the 16th century, both at the summit and from cinder cones on the lower flanks, and also the flank vents of San Marcelino located east of Santa Ana. The San Marcelino vents erupted in 1722 and flowed eastwards for 11 km, destroying the village of San Juan Tecpan.

In October, 2005, the volcano erupted, killing at least two people, injuring seven people, forcing many people to flee their villages. The eruption contributed to the damage from Hurricane Stan. The most recent previous eruption had been in 1904.

Climate
The climate on the northeast facing slope of the volcano sees substantial rainfall in the summer months. Located at 13.9 N, 89.6 W, altitude : 1770 m, the climate is classified as a subtropical highland climate (Köppen Cwb).

See also
 List of volcanoes in El Salvador
 List of stratovolcanoes

References
Notes

Sources
 Sheets P D, 2004. Apocalypse then: social science approaches to volcanism, people, and cultures in the Zapotitan Valley, El Salvador. Rose W. I., Bommer J. J., Lopez D. L., Carr M. J., Major J. J. (eds), Natural Hazards in El Salvador. Bolder, Colorado, Geological Society of America Special Paper 375, pp 109–120.
 Siebert, L. Kimberly, P., and Pullinger, C.R, 2004, The voluminous Acajulta debris avalanche from Santa Ana Volcano, western El Salvador, and comparison with other Central American edifice-failure evens, in Rose, W.I. et al., Natural Hazards in El Salvador. Boulder, Colorado, Geological Society of America Special Paper 375, pp 5–23.

External links
 Nasa Earth Observatory article and image.

Stratovolcanoes of El Salvador
Subduction volcanoes
Active volcanoes
Mountains of El Salvador
Calderas of Central America
Volcanic crater lakes
Pleistocene stratovolcanoes
Holocene stratovolcanoes